James E. King (October 20, 1939 – July 26, 2009) was an American businessman and politician. A Republican, he was a member of Florida House of Representatives from 1986 through 1999, and subsequently represented the 8th District of the Florida Senate from 1999 until his death. He served as President of the Florida Senate from 2002 to 2004 and served as the Majority Leader from 2000 to 2002.

Early years
King was born in Brooklyn, New York, and moved with his family to Florida in 1945, where he became the first member of his family to graduate from high school He attended Florida State University where he earned bachelor's and master's degrees. He married the former Linda Braddock. He has a daughter, Laurie Anne, from his first marriage to Eileen and a daughter, Monta Michelle, from his second marriage to Dorothy King. King had a rocky start in business, nearly going bankrupt twice before he mortgaged his home in 1969 to start an employment service agency, which was successful. In 1997, he sold the company for $15 million and focused on his political career, which began in 1986.

Politics
King was elected to the Florida House of Representatives in 1986. He was elected to the Florida Senate in 1999 and was the president of the senate from 2003-2004.

In 2006, he was opposed in the Republican primary election by Randall Terry, a prominent anti-abortion activist who had opposed him on the Schiavo matter.

Another of King's achievements as senator was his legislation on pet burial, which allowed pet owners to be buried with their furry friends.

Death
In May 2009, King was diagnosed with pancreatic cancer, but the following month, announced that he was cancer-free. In mid-July, his family announced that the disease had spread and he entered a hospice program. Jim King died on Sunday, July 26, 2009.

Education
 Florida State University, B.A., 1961, B.S., 1961, M.B.A., 1962
 St. Petersburg Junior College, A.A., 1959

Legacy
In 2008 The James E. King Life Sciences Building was opened on the Florida State University campus. At the dedication ceremony then university president T. K. Wetherell had this to say about Senator King:

References

External links
Project Vote Smart - Senator James E. 'Jim' King Jr. (FL) profile
City of Jacksonville - Senator King biography

|-

|-

|-

Presidents of the Florida Senate
Republican Party Florida state senators
Republican Party members of the Florida House of Representatives
1939 births
2009 deaths
Politicians from Jacksonville, Florida
People from Brooklyn
Florida State University alumni
Deaths from pancreatic cancer
Deaths from cancer in Florida
20th-century American politicians